Sailing Against the Wind (Estonian: Vastutuulelaev) is a 1984 Estonian novel about the astronomer Bernhard Schmidt by Jaan Kross. An English translation by Eric Dickens was published in January 2012.

Synopsis 
This novel is about the ethnic Estonian Bernhard Schmidt (1879–1935) from the island of Naissaar who loses his right hand in a firework accident during his teenage years. He nevertheless uses his remaining hand to work wonders when polishing high quality lenses and mirrors for astronomical telescopes. Later on, when living in what had become Nazi Germany, he himself invents large stellar telescopes that are still to be found at, for instance, the Mount Palomar Observatory in California and on the island of Mallorca. Schmidt has to wrestle with his conscience when living in Germany as the country is re-arming and telescopes could be put to military use. But because Germany was the leading technical nation at the time, he feels reasonably comfortable there, first in the run-down small town of Mittweida, then at the main Bergedorf Observatory just outside Hamburg. But the rise of the Nazis is literally driving him mad.

References

1984 novels
Estonian novels